Ariana Cinema ( Sīnemā Ārīāna) is a movie theater in Kabul, Afghanistan located near the Pashtunistan Square on the north side of the Kabul river bank. It is considered to be the second oldest cinema in Kabul city center, after Behzad Cinema, and is one of the few remaining in operation. It is publicly owned.

History
In its prime days, Ariana Cinema was a famous theater in the city.

As with other local landmarks, the cinema was destroyed during the Battle of Kabul (1992-96) and remained closed and damaged after the Taliban came to power in 1996. After the fall of Taliban, a group of French filmmakers raised $ 1 million to help complete the cinema. During a visit to Kabul in 2002, Bernard-Henri Lévy met with Siddiq Barmak to discuss the reconstruction of the cinema. On his return to Paris, he co-founded an association to raise funds for the project with Claude Lelouch and Bosnian Danis Tanović,  The 'Un Cinema pour Kaboul' association in Paris. In collaboration with the AINA in Kabul, they completed the reconstruction of the Cinema in March 2004.  The renovation and new facilities was done with the help of Siddiq Barmak.

The cinema received damage later by a January 2010 suicide bombing near the cinema.

As of 2020 it remains one of four cinemas still operating in Kabul and it receives about 200 spectators of 600 available, reflecting the decline of cinema of Afghanistan. Ariana Cinema was active before the fall of Kabul on August 15, 2021, with its current status unknown.

See also 
 Cinema of Afghanistan
 Behzad Cinema
 January 2010 Kabul attack

References

Cinemas in Afghanistan